Maryland Route 638 (MD 638) is a state highway in the U.S. state of Maryland.  Known as Parkersburg Road, the state highway runs  from MD 743 in Eckhart Mines north to MD 36 near Mount Savage in northwestern Allegany County.  MD 638 was constructed in the late 1930s.

Route description

MD 638 begins at an oblique intersection with unsigned MD 743 (Old National Pike) in Eckhart Mines.  The state highway crosses Porter Run on a narrow bridge before meeting U.S. Route 40 Alternate (National Pike).  MD 638 continues north as a two-lane undivided road and ascends the side of Federal Hill.  At Porter Cemetery Hill, the state highway turns northwest and descends into the valley of Jennings Run.  MD 638 passes through two sharp S-curves on either side of a  bridge over the Western Maryland Scenic Railroad.  The state highway reaches its northern terminus at MD 36 (Mount Savage Road) between Mount Savage and Zihlman near the hamlets of Morantown and Slabtown.

History
MD 638 was constructed in its modern form in 1938.

Junction list

See also

References

External links

638
Maryland Route 638